In the mathematical field of complex analysis, contour integration is a method of evaluating certain integrals along paths in the complex plane.

Contour integration is closely related to the calculus of residues, a method of complex analysis.

One use for contour integrals is the evaluation of integrals along the real line that are not readily found by using only real variable methods.

Contour integration methods include:
 direct integration of a complex-valued function along a curve in the complex plane (a contour);
 application of the Cauchy integral formula; and
 application of the residue theorem.
One method can be used, or a combination of these methods, or various limiting processes, for the purpose of finding these integrals or sums.

Curves in the complex plane
In complex analysis a contour is a type of curve in the complex plane. In contour integration, contours provide a precise definition of the curves on which an integral may be suitably defined. A curve in the complex plane is defined as a continuous function from a closed interval of the real line to the complex plane: .

This definition of a curve coincides with the intuitive notion of a curve, but includes a parametrization by a continuous function from a closed interval. This more precise definition allows us to consider what properties a curve must have for it to be useful for integration. In the following subsections we narrow down the set of curves that we can integrate to include only those that can be built up out of a finite number of continuous curves that can be given a direction. Moreover, we will restrict the "pieces" from crossing over themselves, and we require that each piece have a finite (non-vanishing) continuous derivative. These requirements correspond to requiring that we consider only curves that can be traced, such as by a pen, in a sequence of even, steady strokes, which stop only to start a new piece of the curve, all without picking up the pen.

Directed smooth curves
Contours are often defined in terms of directed smooth curves. These provide a precise definition of a "piece" of a smooth curve, of which a contour is made.

A smooth curve is a curve  with a non-vanishing, continuous derivative such that each point is traversed only once ( is one-to-one), with the possible exception of a curve such that the endpoints match. In the case where the endpoints match the curve is called closed, and the function is required to be one-to-one everywhere else and the derivative must be continuous at the identified point. A smooth curve that is not closed is often referred to as a smooth arc.

The parametrization of a curve provides a natural ordering of points on the curve:  comes before  if . This leads to the notion of a directed smooth curve. It is most useful to consider curves independent of the specific parametrization. This can be done by considering equivalence classes of smooth curves with the same direction. A directed smooth curve can then be defined as an ordered set of points in the complex plane that is the image of some smooth curve in their natural order (according to the parametrization). Note that not all orderings of the points are the natural ordering of a smooth curve. In fact, a given smooth curve has only two such orderings. Also, a single closed curve can have any point as its endpoint, while a smooth arc has only two choices for its endpoints.

Contours
Contours are the class of curves on which we define contour integration. A contour is a directed curve which is made up of a finite sequence of directed smooth curves whose endpoints are matched to give a single direction. This includes all directed smooth curves. Also, a single point in the complex plane is considered a contour. The symbol + is often used to denote the piecing of curves together to form a new curve. Thus we could write a contour  that is made up of  curves as

Contour integrals
The contour integral of a complex function  is a generalization of the integral for real-valued functions. For continuous functions in the complex plane, the contour integral can be defined in analogy to the line integral by first defining the integral along a directed smooth curve in terms of an integral over a real valued parameter. A more general definition can be given in terms of partitions of the contour in analogy with the partition of an interval and the Riemann integral. In both cases the integral over a contour is defined as the sum of the integrals over the directed smooth curves that make up the contour.

For continuous functions
To define the contour integral in this way one must first consider the integral, over a real variable, of a complex-valued function. Let  be a complex-valued function of a real variable, .

Then the integral of the complex-valued function  over the interval  is given by 

Let  be a continuous function on the directed smooth curve . Let  be any parametrization of  that is consistent with its order (direction). Then the integral along  is denoted

and is given by

This definition is well defined. That is, the result is independent of the parametrization chosen. In the case where the real integral on the right side does not exist the integral along  is said not to exist.

As a generalization of the Riemann integral
The generalization of the Riemann integral to functions of a complex variable is done in complete analogy to its definition for functions from the real numbers. The integral over the curve is the limit of finite sums of function values, taken at the points on the partition, in the limit that the maximum distance between any two successive points on the partition (in the two-dimensional complex plane), also known as the mesh, goes to zero.

Direct methods
Direct methods involve the calculation of the integral by means of methods similar to those in calculating line integrals in multivariate calculus. This means that we use the following method:
parametrizing the contour
 The contour is parametrized by a differentiable complex-valued function of real variables, or the contour is broken up into pieces and parametrized separately.
 substitution of the parametrization into the integrand
 Substituting the parametrization into the integrand transforms the integral into an integral of one real variable.
 direct evaluation
 The integral is evaluated in a method akin to a real-variable integral.

Example
In the case of the unit circle there is a direct method to evaluate the integral

which is the value of the integral.

Applications of integral theorems
Applications of integral theorems are also often used to evaluate the contour integral along a contour, which means that the real-valued integral is calculated simultaneously along with calculating the contour integral.

Integral theorems such as the Cauchy integral formula or residue theorem are generally used in the following method:
 a specific contour is chosen:
 The contour is chosen so that the contour follows the part of the complex plane that describes the real-valued integral, and also encloses singularities of the integrand so application of the Cauchy integral formula or residue theorem is possible
 application of Cauchy's integral theorem
 The integral is reduced to only an integration around a small circle about each pole.
 application of the Cauchy integral formula or residue theorem
 Application of these integral formulae gives us a value for the integral around the whole of the contour.
 division of the contour into a contour along the real part and imaginary part
 The whole of the contour can be divided into the contour that follows the part of the complex plane that describes the real-valued integral as chosen before (call it ), and the integral that crosses the complex plane (call it ). The integral over the whole of the contour is the sum of the integral over each of these contours.
 demonstration that the integral that crosses the complex plane plays no part in the sum
 If the integral  can be shown to be zero, or if the real-valued integral that is sought is improper, then if we demonstrate that the integral  as described above tends to 0, the integral along  will tend to the integral around the contour .
 conclusion
 If we can show the above step, then we can directly calculate , the real-valued integral.

Example 1
Consider the integral

To evaluate this integral, we look at the complex-valued function

We choose a contour that will enclose the real-valued integral, here a semicircle with boundary diameter on the real line (going from, say,  to ) will be convenient. Call this contour .

There are two ways of proceeding, using the Cauchy integral formula or by the method of residues:

Using the Cauchy integral formula 
Note that:

thus

Furthermore, observe that

Since the only singularity in the contour is the one at , then we can write

which puts the function in the form for direct application of the formula. Then, by using Cauchy's integral formula,

We take the first derivative, in the above steps, because the pole is a second-order pole. If it were  taken to the third power, we would use the second derivative and divide by 2!, etc.

where  is an upper bound on  along the arc and  the length of the arc. Now,

So

Using the method of residues
We then have

(See the sample Laurent calculation from Laurent series for the derivation of this series.)

Thus we get the same result as before.

Contour note
As an aside, a question can arise whether we do not take the semicircle to include the other singularity, enclosing . To have the integral along the real axis moving in the correct direction, the contour must travel clockwise, i.e., in a negative direction, reversing the sign of the integral overall.

This does not affect the use of the method of residues by series.

Example 2 – Cauchy distribution
The integral

(which arises in probability theory as a scalar multiple of the characteristic function of the Cauchy distribution) resists the techniques of elementary calculus. Take  to be greater than 1, so that the imaginary unit  is enclosed within the curve. The contour integral is

Since  is an entire function (having no singularities at any point in the complex plane), this function has singularities only where the denominator  is zero. Only one of those points is in the region bounded by this contour.

According to the residue theorem, then, we have

The contour  may be split into a "straight" part and a curved arc, so that

and thus

According to Jordan's lemma, if  then

Therefore, if  then

A similar argument with an arc that winds around  rather than  shows that if  then

and finally we have this:

Example 3 – trigonometric integrals
Certain substitutions can be made to integrals involving trigonometric functions, so the integral is transformed into a rational function of a complex variable and then the above methods can be used in order to evaluate the integral.

As an example, consider

Now, recall

and

Taking  to be the unit circle, we substitute to get:

Example 3a – trigonometric integrals, the general procedure
The above method may be applied to all integrals of the type

Note that the bounds of integration may as well be  and −, as in the previous example, or any other pair of endpoints 2 apart.

The trick is to use the substitution  where  and hence

This substitution maps the interval  to the unit circle. Furthermore,

and

so that a rational function  in  results from the substitution, and the integral becomes

which is in turn computed by summing the residues of  inside the unit circle.

The image at right illustrates this for

which we now compute. The first step is to recognize that

The substitution yields

Example 4 – branch cuts
Consider the real integral

We can begin by formulating the complex integral

We can use the Cauchy integral formula or residue theorem again to obtain the relevant residues. However, the important thing to note is that , so  has a branch cut. This affects our choice of the contour . Normally the logarithm branch cut is defined as the negative real axis, however, this makes the calculation of the integral slightly more complicated, so we define it to be the positive real axis.

Then, we use the so-called keyhole contour, which consists of a small circle about the origin of radius  say, extending to a line segment parallel and close to the positive real axis but not touching it, to an almost full circle, returning to a line segment parallel, close, and below the positive real axis in the negative sense, returning to the small circle in the middle.

These are the two remaining poles, derivable by factoring the denominator of the integrand.

Let  be the small circle of radius ,  the larger, with radius , then

Now since , on the contour outside the branch cut, we have gained 2 in argument along . (By Euler's identity,  represents the unit vector, which therefore has  as its log. The coefficient of  forces us to use 2.) So

Therefore:

By using the residue theorem or the Cauchy integral formula (first employing the partial fractions method to derive a sum of two simple contour integrals) one obtains

Example 5 – the square of the logarithm

This section treats a type of integral of which

is an example.

To calculate this integral, one uses the function

We will calculate the integral of  along the keyhole contour shown at right. As it turns out this integral is a multiple of the initial integral that we wish to calculate and by the Cauchy residue theorem we have

Let  be the radius of the large circle, and  the radius of the small one. The contributions from the two circles vanish. For example, one has the following upper bound with the  lemma:

which gives

Example 6 – logarithms and the residue at infinity

We seek to evaluate

This requires a close study of

To do this, we choose two branches of the logarithm, setting

and

It is easy to see that the cut of the product of the two, i.e. This is because when  and we approach the cut from above,  has the value

When we approach from below,  has the value

But

so that we have continuity across the cut.

We will use the contour shown in green in the diagram. To do this we must compute the value of  along the line segments just above and just below the cut.

Let  (in the limit, i.e. as the two green circles shrink to radius zero), where . Along the upper segment, we find that  has the value

and along the lower segment,

For the circle  on the left, we find

Similarly, for the circle  on the right, we have

Now using the Cauchy residue theorem, we have

where the minus sign is due to the clockwise direction around the residues. Using the branch of the logarithm from before, clearly

The pole is shown in blue in the diagram. The value simplifies to

We use the following formula for the residue at infinity:

Substituting, we find

and

where we have used the fact that  for the second branch of the logarithm. Next we apply the binomial expansion, obtaining

The conclusion is that

which yields

Evaluation with residue theorem
Using the residue theorem, we can evaluate closed contour integrals. The following are examples on evaluating contour integrals with the residue theorem.

Using the residue theorem, let's evaluate this contour integral.

As a refresher, the residue theorem states

 has only one pole, .

Thus, using the residue theorem, we can determine:

Multivariable contour integrals
To solve multivariable contour integrals (i.e. surface integrals, complex volume integrals, and higher order integrals), we must use the divergence theorem. This theorem states:

The divergence of any dimension can be described as

Example 1
Let the vector field  and be bounded by the following

The corresponding double contour integral would be set up as such:

We now evaluate . While we're at it, let's set up the corresponding triple integral:

Example 2
Let the vector field , and remark that there are 4 parameters in this case. Let this vector field be bounded by the following:

To evaluate this, we must utilize the divergence theorem as stated before, and we must evaluate . Let 

Integral representation 

An integral representation of a function is an expression of the function involving a contour integral. Various integral representations are known for many special functions. Integral representations can be important for theoretical reasons, e.g. giving analytic continuation or functional equations, or sometimes for numerical evaluations.

For example, the original definition of the Riemann zeta function  via a Dirichlet series,

But

where the integration is done over the Hankel contour , is valid for all complex s not equal to 1.

See also
 Residue (complex analysis)
 Cauchy principal value
 Poisson integral
 Pochhammer contour

References

Further reading

 Jean Jacquelin, Marko Riedel, Branche univalente, Les-Mathematiques.net, in French.
 Marko Riedel et al., Problème d'intégrale, Les-Mathematiques.net, in French.
 Marko Riedel et al., Integral by residue, math.stackexchange.com.
 W W L Chen, Introduction to Complex Analysis
 Various authors, sin límites ni cotas, es.ciencia.matematicas, in Spanish.

External links

Complex analysis